The Maharaja's Victory is a 1923 German silent film directed by Joseph Delmont and starring Luciano Albertini, Erich Kaiser-Titz and Wilhelm Diegelmann.

The film's sets were designed by the art director Willi Herrmann.

Cast
 Luciano Albertini
 Erich Kaiser-Titz
 Wilhelm Diegelmann
 Lili Dominici
 Rolf Müller

References

Bibliography
 Alfred Krautz. International directory of cinematographers, set- and costume designers in film, Volume 4. Saur, 1984.

External links

1923 films
Films of the Weimar Republic
German silent feature films
Films directed by Joseph Delmont
German black-and-white films
Phoebus Film films
1920s German films